The Gruppo Italiano per lo Studio della Sopravvivenza nell'Infarto Miocardico (GISSI) (Italian group for the study of the survival of myocardial infarction) is a cardiology research group founded as a collaboration between two Italian organisations – the Mario Negri Institute and the Associazione Nazionale dei Medici Cardiologi Ospedalieri (ANMCO).

Four large-scale clinical trials (GISSI 1, GISSI 2, GISSI 3, GISSI Prevention) have involved over 60,000 people with acute myocardial infarction (AMI).

Selected publications

References

External links
 Gissi website

Heart disease organizations
Medical and health organisations based in Italy
Epidemiological study projects
Clinical trials related to cardiology
Cardiology